is a railway station on the Kagoshima Main Line operates by JR Kyushu in Tobata-ku, Kitakyushu, Japan. Its name means, literally, "In front of Kyushu Institute of Technology".

History
The station was opened with the name  by Japanese National Railways (JNR) on 1 November 1970 as an added station on the existing track of the Kagoshima Main Line. On 1 April 1987, with the privatization of JNR, JR Kyushu took over control of the station. On 1 November 1990, the station name was changed to Kyūshūkōdai-mae.

Passenger statistics
In fiscal 2016, the station was used by 4,473 passengers daily, and it ranked 46th among the busiest stations of JR Kyushu.

References

External links
Kyūshūkōdai-mae Station (JR Kyushu)

Railway stations in Fukuoka Prefecture
Railway stations in Japan opened in 1970